Shaharuddin Abdullah is a Malaysian former footballer. He was once one of the most feared strikers in the country, known as "Harimau Malaysia" because of his ability to score goals. He once scored 15 goals for Malaysia in the Merdeka Cup which stood as a record for a very long time.  His father, Abdullah Mohammad, was a goalkeeper for Penang in the 1950s. He was a part of the Malaysian squad at the 1972 Summer Olympics.

Career overview
He started to play football when he was 9 years old. He used the Marin Sg. Gelugor field near his house to learn the football skills. He helped his school, Sekolah Kebangsaan Sungai Gelugor, to won the district and inter-school championships.

In 1964 when he was 16 years old, he was selected to play for the Penang Burnley Cup team along with his brother, Namat Abdullah, Ali Bakar, Mohammed Bakar, Khalil Hashim, Cha Peng Chiang, Yap Kim Kok and N Baskaran.

He played for Malaysia in the 1972 Munich Olympics. Shaharuddin playing all three group games and scoring in the 3-0 won against United States. Overall he made 70 appearances and scored 39 international goals for Malaysia.

In 2004, he was inducted in Olympic Council of Malaysia's Hall of Fame for 1972 Summer Olympics football team.

Personal life
Namat Abdullah, his brother also played for Penang and together with his uncle, Aziz Ahmad. Shaharuddin's son, Shafiq Shaharudin, is also a professional footballer.

Honours
Penang
 Burnley Cup: 1964/65, 1966
 Malaysia Kings Gold Cup: 1966, 1968, 1969
 Malaysia Cup: 1974
 Aga Khan Gold Cup: 1976
 Malaysia League: 1982

Penjara
 Malaysia FAM Cup: 1970, 1971, 1973

Malaysia
 Bronze medal Asian Games: 1974
 Kings Cup: 1972
 Merdeka Cup: 1968, 1973, 1974

References

External links
 Profile at Sports Council, Prison Department of Malaysia

1948 births
Malaysian footballers
Malaysia international footballers
People from Penang
Penang F.C. players
Olympic footballers of Malaysia
Footballers at the 1972 Summer Olympics
Living people
Southeast Asian Games medalists in football
Southeast Asian Games silver medalists for Malaysia
Association football forwards
Competitors at the 1971 Southeast Asian Peninsular Games